One Town, One Product may refer to:
 One Town, One Product (Philippines)
 One Town One Product (Republic of China)

See also
 One Tambon One Product, a program in Thailand
 One Village One Product, a program in Japan